New Haven Harbor is an inlet on the north side of Long Island Sound in the state of Connecticut. The harbor area is an inlet carved by the retreat of the glaciers during the last ice age approximately 13,000 years ago.

The city of New Haven  and its neighborhoods of City Point, Long Wharf, The Annex, and East Shore lie on the northern and eastern sides. West Haven is on the west. The Quinnipiac and Mill rivers converge and empty into the inlet on its north end. The Pearl Harbor Memorial Bridge crosses here. The West River empties into the western end of the harbor (also known as West Haven Harbor).

The harbor is protected from Long Island Sound by a peninsula on its eastern side, once known as "Little Necke" but now called Lighthouse Point, because of the lighthouse that was constructed on its tip in 1805. The original lighthouse was replaced in 1845 by the current structure, called the Five Mile Point Lighthouse.  This lighthouse was replaced for navigation in 1877 by the offshore Southwest Ledge Light.  Sperry Lighthouse (1899–1933) also served the harbor.

In July 1779, during the American Revolutionary War, the peninsula was the scene of an amphibious landing by British troops.

The harbor is circumnavigable via the partially completed "Harborside Greenway" bicycle and pedestrian trail, which is part of the East Coast Greenway system.

External links

 Guide to New Haven Harbor
 Five Mile Point Lighthouse
 Sperry Lighthouse

Estuaries of Connecticut
Geography of New Haven, Connecticut
Geography of New Haven County, Connecticut
West Haven, Connecticut
Transportation in New Haven County, Connecticut
Ports and harbors of Connecticut
Long Island Sound
Landforms of New Haven County, Connecticut